Wynnewood station is a SEPTA Regional Rail station in Wynnewood, Pennsylvania. It is located at Wynnewood and Penn Roads in Philadelphia's western suburbs, and is served by most Paoli/Thorndale Line trains with the exception of several express runs.

The station was built in 1870 by the Wilson Brothers architectural firm for the Pennsylvania Railroad, and is one of the historic station buildings on the line built before 1930. 

The station offers a small retail space, which is currently unused. The space was formerly occupied by Main Line Baking Company (2010-2016), Pup's Cafe (2009), Quaker Coffee (2005 - 2008), and Irish Bake Shoppe (1999 - 2005). The ticket office at this station is open weekdays 6:00 a.m. to 12:00 p.m. (excluding holidays). There are 239 daily and permit parking spaces at the station. This station is 7.4 track miles from Suburban Station. In 2017, the average total weekday boardings at this station was 765, and the average total weekday alightings was 561.

Restoration and beautification
The Wynnewood Civic Association is a non-profit group of volunteers that maintains the landscaping and actively works to preserve and beautify the historic landmark.

In popular culture
The train station scene from the 1962 film David and Lisa was filmed at this station.

Station layout
Wynnewood has two low-level side platforms with pathways connecting the platforms to the inner tracks.

References

External links

 SEPTA - Wynnewood Station
 Penn Road entrance from Google Maps Street View
 Station House from Google Maps Street View

Philadelphia Main Line
SEPTA Regional Rail stations
Former Pennsylvania Railroad stations
Lower Merion Township, Pennsylvania
Railway stations in Montgomery County, Pennsylvania
Railway stations in the United States opened in 1870
1870 establishments in Pennsylvania
Philadelphia to Harrisburg Main Line